Mediocredito or Istituti Regionali per il Finanziamento alle Medie e Piccole Industrie were 19 Italian banks that established in 1950s to provide medium term loan to small and medium companies (or more specifically industrial companies), they served 19 regions of Italy (Molise region was established in 1963), with Aosta Valley did not have their dedicated bank. One more bank (Mediocredito Centrale) did not belong to any region. Nowadays 4 banks survived, plus one bank transformed into different purpose and one bank renamed:

The banks were established based on Italian Law N°445 of 1950.

Current banks
 Mediocredito Italiano, a subsidiary of Intesa Sanpaolo; was a Cariplo subsidiary (also known as Mediocredito Lombardo, Banca Intesa Mediocredito)
 Banca Mediocredito del Friuli Venezia Giulia, an Italian bank that was controlled by the regional government
 Investitionsbank Trentino Südtirol – Mediocredito Trentino Alto Adige, an Italian bank that was controlled by the regional and provincial government
 Banca del Mezzogiorno – MedioCredito Centrale, a subsidiary of Poste italiane (also known as UniCredit Mediocredito Centrale), an indirect subsidiary of the Ministry of Economy and Finance
 IRFIS – FinSicilia, was known as IRFIS - Mediocredito della Sicilia, an Italian financial institute and wholly owned subsidiary of the region
 Mediocredito Toscano, former name of MPS Capital Services, a subsidiary of Banca Monte dei Paschi di Siena

Defunct bank
 UniCredit Banca Mediocredito, former Mediocredito Piemontese, a defunct subsidiary of Banca CRT (UniCredit)
 Mediocredito dell'Umbria, a defunct subsidiary of Banca dell'Umbria (UniCredit)
 Mediocredito delle Venezie, a defunct subsidiary of Cariverona Banca (UniCredit)
 Mediocredito Abruzzese e Molisano, an Italian bank that was absorbed by Mediocredito Italiano (Intesa Sanpaolo)
 Mediocredito del Sud, an Italian bank that was absorbed by Mediocredito Italiano (Intesa Sanpaolo), was a merger of the Mediocredito from Basilicata, Calabria and Apulia
 Mediocredito Emilia-Romagna, a predecessor of BIMER Banca, a defunct subsidiary of Cassa di Risparmio in Bologna
 Mediocredito Ligure, a defunct subsidiary of Cassa di Risparmio di Genova e Imperia
 Mediocredito Fondiario Centroitalia, a defunct subsidiary of Banca delle Marche, also known as Mediocredito delle Marche
 Mediocredito di Roma, a defunct subsidiary of Banca di Roma, serving Lazio region
 Credito Industriale Sardo, a predecessor of Banca di Credito Sardo, a defunct subsidiary of Intesa Sanpaolo, serving Sardinia Island
 Istituto per lo Sviluppo Economico dell'Italia Meridionale (ISVEIMER), a defunct bank based in Naples, served southern Italy except the two islands, subsidiary of Intesa Sanpaolo

See also
 Mediocredito Padano, a defunct subsidiary of Cassa di Risparmio di Parma e Piacenza
 Mediobanca

References

External links
 Entry in bankpedia

Banks of Italy